Sarrians is a commune in the Vaucluse department in the Provence-Alpes-Côte d'Azur region in southeastern France.

Population

Hominin remains
Several hominin bones, showing breakages due to sediment pressure, have been found nearby.

See also
Communes of the Vaucluse department

References

Communes of Vaucluse